Minna Arve (born 1974) is a Finnish politician who serves as the mayor of Turku. Since August 2021 the post of the mayor became an elected office instead of a hired position. She represents the National Coalition Party.

Education 
Arve first studied to become a nurse and graduated in 1996. She worked as a nurse between 1997-2004 and studied economics at the Turku School of Economics and earned her master's degree in Marketing in 2004 after working for a medical company.

In addition to her mother tongue, Finnish, Arve also knows English, Swedish, French and German.

Political career 
Arve joined the NCP in 1994. Between 2010 and 2014 Arve was the chair of the city council of Turku. She has worked as the party's general secretary and was elected to the post in 2014.

Arve was first elected into the city council of Turku in 2004. She has been reelected ever since. In 2017 the city council chose her as the town manager of Turku when her predecessor Aleksi Randell became the CEO of the Finnish construction industry's interest organisation. Next year Kuntalehti, a Finnish magazine on municipal politics, published a comparison of 40 municipal manager's salaries, which placed Arve on the top with gross monthly income of 15,311 euros. In the 2021 municipal election, where she ran as her party's mayoral candidate, Arve got 1510 votes, third most in her party after MPs Petteri Orpo and Ilkka Kanerva.

Political position 
According to VAA published by Yle in 2021, Arve said that she is for needle exchange for the drug users in Turku, offering free protection to people under 25, and having a pride flag in public buildings.

As Arve became the general secretary of NCP (Oct2014 to Jan2016) she described the party as a big tent with values.

In March 2022, Arve courted controversy when upholding the banning of a Ukrainian flag being flown near the Russian consulate in Turku in protest against the Russian invasion of Ukraine.

References

20th-century Finnish women politicians
21st-century Finnish women politicians
1974 births
Living people
National Coalition Party politicians
Politicians from Turku
Women mayors of places in Finland